Heavy rainfall in the early February 2016 has caused major flooding in the state of Sarawak, Johor, Malacca and parts of Negeri Sembilan.

Affected areas

Sarawak 
On 9 February, total number of flood evacuees in Kuching, Bau, Samarahan and Serian risen to 1,065 people from 765, and increase to over 5,600 in 11 February. Until 22 February, the number of flood evacuees reach 7,965. The flood in the state has caused the Sarawak General Hospital to be inundated, as well many snakes and crocodiles to wandering around the flood areas and attacking humans. On 20 February, one teenager become the only casualty after fell into a river. Until 26 February, a total of 7,288 students were affected by floods and 10 schools has been used as a temporary evacuation centres. During the floods, a teacher with his family were stranded when a suspension bridge collapse.

Johor 
On 7 February, two casualties were reported in Johor with one being swept by strong current and another one were fallen into a fishing pond. On 9 February, the evacuees in Tangkak, Ledang and Segamat dropped slightly, from 137 people to 135 people.

Malacca and Negeri Sembilan 
On 8 February, around 4,600 people have been evacuated in the state of Malacca with 3,020 victims were housed at six evacuation centres on Central Malacca District, 1,560 victims sheltered in six evacuation centres on Alor Gajah District and another 24 victims at one relief centre in Jasin District. The total evacuees however decrease to 189 people in 9 February after the flood situation improves.

In Negeri Sembilan, the total evacuees were 671 as of 7 February, and increase to 705 on 8 February while all the evacuating centres closed on the same day after the flood water have receded.

Responses

Locals 
 — The Chief Minister of Sarawak Adenan Satem has ordered relevant agencies to provide aid and other basic necessities to flood victims in the state. The Sarawak state government also has promised to find a long-term solution to prevent such floods recurring in the near future. While the Malaysian Fire and Rescue Department conducting their daily works rescuing stranded victims, they also helping to clean schools, roads and flood victims houses. The University of Malaysia Sabah (UMS) through the Student Welfare Committee (JAKMAS) Tun Mustapha Residential College (KKTM) held a charity drive to help the flood victims in Sarawak. The United Malays National Organisation (UMNO) has sent aid in the form of foodstuffs and basic necessities to 1,500 families affected by floods in Malacca and Negeri Sembilan.

See also 
 2014–15 Malaysia floods
 2015 East Malaysian floods

References 

Malaysian
Malaysian
Floods in Malaysia
February 2016 events in Malaysia